Anthony Francis Coutinho (born 25 August 1940) is an Indian sprinter. He competed in the men's 4 × 100 metres relay at the 1964 Summer Olympics.

References

External links
 

1940 births
Living people
Athletes (track and field) at the 1964 Summer Olympics
Indian male sprinters
Olympic athletes of India
Place of birth missing (living people)